The Yale Alley Cats is an undergraduate a cappella singing group at Yale University. Founded in 1943, it is the college's third-oldest underclassman a cappella group. 

In the summer of 1943, four Yale undergraduate students climbed Saybrook Tower to serenade the night with Henry Carey's "Sally in Our Alley." Their singing awoke the Head of College, who yelled at them "Stop it! Your singing sounds like a bunch of screeching alley cats!" and sent them to bed. The performance marked the founding of the group and gave it its name. 

While the group’s early repertoire was based primarily in jazz, their current arrangements (composed by present or former group members) span pop, R&B, Motown, folk, and other genres. The group has created more than 300 a cappella arrangements.

Each year, the Alley Cats hosts a large on-campus performance known as the "Champagne Jamboree," traditionally featuring a female guest soloist and a dance number. The group also performs for public and private audiences throughout the United States and around the world. Their performance tours are funded through concert revenue.  

The Yale Alley Cats have entertained audiences worldwide, performing for many notable figures including Martha Stewart, Jay Leno, Stella McCartney, Tom Brokaw, and President Barack Obama. 

In 2017, they performed at Facebook headquarters and Google headquarters on their tour of the California Bay Area, then later at the United Nations office in Geneva, Switzerland, and at the United States Embassy in Paris, France. In 2018, the group completed a ten-city tour of China through the invitation of Beijing Shengchou Education Technology Company, including collaborations with the Central Conservatory of Music and other schools and hotels across the nation such as the Little Swan Choir in Xi'an. In 2021, the Cats collaborated with songwriter Diane Warren to create a music video of her lead single from the movie Four Good Days, "Somehow You Do".

As with many Yale a cappella groups, first-year students audition in a multi-week process known as "rush." Current Alley Cats choose several applicants to join the group for three years.

Notable alumni
Many Alley Cats go on to join The Yale Whiffenpoofs—a selective, all-senior, all-male a cappella group—and some have gone on to careers in the performing arts, including:

James Bohanek ‘91, Broadway actor
Jacob Clemente '19, starred as Billy in Billy Elliot the Musical
Manoel Felciano '92, actor, singer-songwriter
Andy Sandberg '06, producer, director, writer, actor
Josh Singer '94, writer, producer
George R. Steel '94, musician, composer

Discography
The Yale Alley Cats have recorded 35 albums and one EP, including several live albums. Their 2013 album "Ghost of a Chance," on the Bridge Records, Inc. label, was submitted to the 52nd Grammy Awards for Best Pop Vocal Album. Their 2021 album "Gemini," was nominated for Best Lower Voices Collegiate Album by the Contemporary A Capella Society (CASA).

References

External links

Yale's A Cappella Rush NPR
Samples of Alley Cat Performances
Current roster and biographies

Alley Cats
Collegiate a cappella groups
Musical groups established in 1943